The Golden Triangle is a major 330 km cycling route located in western Canada along the border between British Columbia and Alberta, forming a triangle with Lake Louise, Golden and Radium Hot Springs as its points. It crosses the Continental Divide of the Americas twice, through the Kicking Horse Pass between Lake Louise and Golden, and the Vermilion Pass between Radium Hot Springs and Lake Louise. The Triangle can be "extended" by riding to Jasper on the Icefields Parkway from Lake Louise. At its highest points the trail reaches elevations of 1640 m.

References 

Bicycle tours